Sékou Sangaré (born 14 September 1974) is a Malian former professional footballer who played as a midfielder.

Career
Sangaré played club football for Auxerre B, Tours, Aubervilliers and Paris.

He was a member of the Mali national team from 1994 to 2001, competing at the 1994 African Cup of Nations.

References

1974 births
Living people
Association football midfielders
Malian footballers
Mali international footballers
AJ Auxerre players
Tours FC players
FCM Aubervilliers players
Paris FC players
Malian expatriate footballers
Malian expatriate sportspeople in France
Expatriate footballers in France
21st-century Malian people
1994 African Cup of Nations players